Liverpool Football Club is an English professional association football club based in Liverpool, Merseyside, who currently play in the Premier League. They have played at their current home ground, Anfield, since their foundation in 1892. Liverpool entered the Lancashire League in their first season, winning the league. The club applied to English Football League, to become members of the Second Division in the following season, their application was accepted. Since that time the club's first team has competed in numerous nationally and internationally organised competitions. Since playing their first competitive match, more than 800 players have made a competitive first-team appearance for the club, of whom 220 players have made at least 100 appearances (including substitute appearances); those players are listed here.

Liverpool's record appearance-maker is Ian Callaghan, who made 857 appearances between 1958 and 1978. Jamie Carragher has made the second-most appearances with 737. Eight other players have made more than 600 appearances for the club, every one of them being part of at least one European Cup-winning team. Ian Rush is the club's record goalscorer; he scored 346 goals in his 16 years at Liverpool. Rush is the only player to score more than 300 goals for Liverpool; only three other players have scored more than 200 goals for the club.

Players
Appearances and goals are for first-team competitive matches only, including Premier League, English Football League, FA Cup, EFL Cup, FA Charity/Community Shield, European Cup/UEFA Champions League, UEFA Cup/UEFA Europa League, UEFA Cup Winners' Cup, Inter-Cities Fairs Cup, UEFA Super Cup and FIFA Club World Cup matches; wartime matches are regarded as unofficial and are excluded, as are matches from the abandoned 1939–40 season.
Players are listed according to the date of their first team début for the club.
Positions are listed according to the tactical formations that were employed at the time. Thus the change in the names of defensive and midfield reflects the tactical evolution that occurred from the 1960s onwards.
Statistics correct .

Table headers
 Nationality – If a player played international football, the country/countries he played for are shown. Otherwise, the player's nationality is given as their country of birth.
 Liverpool career – The year of the player's first appearance for Liverpool to the year of his last appearance.
 Starts – The number of games started.
 Sub – The number of games played as a substitute. Substitutions were only introduced to the Football League in the 1960s.
 Total – The total number of games played, both as a starter and as a substitute.

100 players who shook the Kop
A poll of 110,000 Liverpool F.C. fans in 2006 revealed their opinion on the "100 players who shook the Kop", i.e. whose contribution had a big impact on the club. The overall winner was Kenny Dalglish ahead of Steven Gerrard. (Note: not all of these players made over 100 appearances for the club). British newspapers frequently refer to the list placings when discussing the careers of players included.

A second running of the poll in 2013 saw Gerrard replace Dalglish at the top of the list, as well as some new entries (mostly post-2006 players).

References
General
 
 

Specific

External links

 LFCHistory.net has a list of  Liverpool F.C. players.
 ThisIsAnfield.com has a complete list of every Liverpool player since 1892.

 
Lists of association football players by club in England
Players
Association football player non-biographical articles